José Manuel Serrano Arenas (born 17 March 1981) is a Spanish former footballer who played as a defender.

Club career
Serrano was born in Seville, Andalusia. After spending four years with local Sevilla FC's reserves, without any first-team appearances, he stayed one season with neighbouring Segunda División side Xerez CD and then switched to Levante UD.

Initially, Serrano played almost exclusively with the reserves in Segunda División B, making his first-team and La Liga debut aged almost 26 in a 2–4 home defeat against Sevilla on 28 January 2007. The following campaign, he scored in a 1–5 home loss to Valencia CF as Levante were already relegated.

For 2008–09, Serrano joined Madrid club Rayo Vallecano, freshly returned to the second division, appearing in only 20 league games out of 84 over the course of two years and being released, after which he signed a two-year contract with Cádiz CF, returning to his native region.

On 19 August 2013, 32-year-old Serrano moved to amateurs CD Alcalá from Tercera División.

References

External links

1981 births
Living people
Footballers from Seville
Spanish footballers
Association football defenders
La Liga players
Segunda División players
Segunda División B players
Tercera División players
Sevilla Atlético players
Xerez CD footballers
Atlético Levante UD players
Levante UD footballers
Rayo Vallecano players
Cádiz CF players
CD Alcalá players
Spain youth international footballers